Lovelyn Chinwe Enebechi (born 21 October 1996) is a German-Nigerian fashion model, best known for winning the eighth cycle of Germany's Next Topmodel.

Germany's Next Topmodel
Enebechi was chosen from 15,500 applicants to be one of the final 25 finalists of cycle 8 of Germany's Next Topmodel. Ultimately, she was crowned the winner of the competition during the cycle's live finale on May 30, 2013, beating Maike van Grieken. As her prizes, she received a spread in and cover of German Cosmopolitan, an Opel Adam, a modeling contract with ONEeins Management, a €250,000 cash prize and an apartment in a fashion capital of her choice.

References

German female models
People from Hamburg
1996 births
Living people
German people of Nigerian descent
Germany's Next Topmodel winners